The Mesilla Diversion Dam is located in the Rio Grande about  upstream of El Paso, Texas, about  to the south of Las Cruces, New Mexico. It diverts water from the river for irrigation in the lower Mesilla Valley. 
The dam is owned by the United States Bureau of Reclamation, which built it, and is operated by the Elephant Butte Irrigation District.

Background
The first small canals in the Mesilla Valley were dug in 1841, and more canals were dug after 1848, when Mexico ceded the region to the United States. By 1897, there were five main canals, all north of Chamberino.
In 1908, the Leasburg Diversion Dam was completed. Water flow was still unpredictable, with the river often drying up for several months. This changed with the closure of Elephant Butte Dam in 1915, which regulated the flow.
The Mesilla Diversion Dam was completed in 1916. By this time, the canal system served all of the valley.

Structure
The dam was built as part of the Rio Grande Project.
It consists of a low concrete weir with radial gates, flanked by levees. The dam has a structural height of  

The west side spillway has nine radial gates, each . 
The east side spillway has four radial gates, each .

Canals
Near its end, the West Side Canal crosses underneath the Rio Grande via the Montoya Siphon.

References
Citations

Sources

Dams in New Mexico
Buildings and structures in Doña Ana County, New Mexico
Dams completed in 1916
United States local public utility dams
Dams on the Rio Grande
1916 establishments in New Mexico